Cipete Raya Station is a rapid transit station on the North-South Line of the Jakarta MRT in Jakarta, Indonesia.

Close to the station is Jalan Cipete Raya (Cipete Raya Street), hence its name.

History 

Station layout

Gallery

References

External links 
  Cipete Raya Station on the Jakarta MRT website

South Jakarta
Jakarta MRT stations
Railway stations opened in 2019